Josip Bozanić (born 20 March 1949) is a Croatian Cardinal of the Catholic Church. He is the eighth Archbishop of Zagreb, having previously served as Bishop of Krk from 1989 to 1997. He was elevated to the cardinalate in 2003. He is a member of the Supervisory Commission of Cardinals of the Institute for the Works of Religion, along with other five cardinals.

Biography

Early life and ordination
Josip Bozanić was born in Rijeka, Yugoslavia (now Croatia), to Ivan Bozanić and Dinka Valković. He attended the minor seminary of Pazin, and the Theological Faculties of Rijeka and Zagreb, where he obtained a Master's degree in theology. He was ordained to the priesthood on 29 June 1975 by Bishop Karmelo Zazinović, to whom Bozanić then served as private secretary until 1976.

Pastoral work
He was a parish priest for three years before furthering his studies in Rome from 1979 to 1985. He earned a licentiate in dogmatic theology from the Pontifical Gregorian University and a licentiate in canon law from the Pontifical Lateran University.

Upon his return to Yugoslavia, he served as chancellor (1986–1987) and vicar general (1987–1989) of the Diocese of Krk. He also taught dogmatic theology and canon law at the Theological Institute of Rijeka from 1988 to 1997.

Bishop
On 10 May 1989, Bozanić was appointed Coadjutor Bishop of Krk by Pope John Paul II. He received his episcopal consecration on the following 25 June from Franjo Cardinal Kuharić, with Archbishop Josip Pavlišić and Bishop Zazinović serving as co-consecrators, at Assumption Cathedral. He later succeeded Zazinović as Bishop of Krk upon the latter's retirement on 14 November 1989; one of his ancestors, Bartol Bozanić, served in the same post from 1839 to 1854.

He briefly served as Apostolic Administrator for the Archdiocese of Rijeka-Senj from June to November 1996, and was named the eighth Archbishop of Zagreb on 5 July 1997. He has also been the president of the Croatian Bishops' Conference between 1997 and 2007, and the vice-president of the Council of European Bishops' Conferences between 2001 and 2006.

Cardinal
John Paul II created him Cardinal-Priest of San Girolamo dei Croati in the consistory of 21 October 2003. Bozanić was one of the cardinal electors who participated in the 2005 papal conclave that elected Pope Benedict XVI.

Within the Roman Curia, he is a member of the Congregation for Divine Worship and the Discipline of the Sacraments, the Congregation for Catholic Education (renewed on 11 December 2010), the Pontifical Council for the Laity, and the Special Council for Europe of the General Secretariat of the Synod of Bishops. On 5 January 2011 he was appointed among the first members of the newly created Pontifical Council for the Promotion of the New Evangelisation.

On 29 December 2011 he was appointed a member of the Pontifical Council for Social Communications for a five-year renewable term.

On Tuesday, 18 September 2012, Cardinal Bozanić was named by Pope Benedict XVI as one of the papally-appointed Synod Fathers for the upcoming October 2012 13th Ordinary General Assembly of the Synod of Bishops on the New Evangelization.

He was one of the cardinal electors who participated in the 2013 papal conclave that selected Pope Francis.

Views on Homosexuality

In 2013, he intervened in the political campaign to alter the Croatian referendum so that it more explicitly defined marriage only as a union between a man and a woman. He issued a pastoral letter to be read in all Catholic churches across the country reminding parishioners that "Marriage is the only union enabling procreation". The referendum was subsequently approved by a vote of 66% to 34%; and was thus regarded as a major victory for the Roman Catholic Church, and a blow to gay rights advocates.

References

External links

 
Biography @ catholic-pages.com

1949 births
Living people
People from Rijeka
Pontifical Gregorian University alumni
Pontifical Lateran University alumni
Bishops of Krk
Archbishops of Zagreb
Bishops appointed by Pope John Paul II
21st-century Roman Catholic archbishops in Croatia
20th-century Roman Catholic archbishops in Croatia
Cardinals created by Pope John Paul II
Croatian cardinals
21st-century cardinals
Members of the Pontifical Council for the Promotion of the New Evangelisation